Zubaan Books is an imprint of Kali for Women, India's first feminist publishing house.

History

In 1984, Urvashi Butalia and Ritu Menon founded Kali for Women, India's first feminist publishing house. Its  objectives were to publish quality work which meet international standards. Over the years it has become an important publishing house nationally and internationally. In 2003 Urvashi Butalia founded Zubaan.

In 2011, Urvashi Butalia and Ritu Menon were jointly conferred the Padma Shri award, for their contribution to the nation by Government of India.

Meaning of Zubaan

The word 'Zubaan' comes from Hindustani and means, literally, tongue, but it has many other meanings, such as voice, language, speech and dialect.

Genres and imprints

Zubaan has a considerable list of academic books examining issues of gender. It has a growing list of autobiographies of women, the best known of which is A Life Less Ordinary by Baby Halder. As part of its initiative to publish broadbased popular books, Zubaan regularly publishes fiction by women writers. Genres range from literary fiction to science fiction to speculative fiction. Under the imprint of Young Zubaan, there is also a growing list of fiction for the age group 6 to 18 including books like Riddle of the Seventh Stone.

Authors

Baby Halder
Bama
Tabish Khair
Vandana Singh
Salma
Priya Sarukkai Chabbria
Anjum Hasan
Susan Visvanathan
Urvashi Butalia
Mahua Sarkar
Salim Kidwai
Janaki Nair
Uma Chakravarti
Farah Naqvi
Radha Kumar

References

External links
 

Book publishing companies of India
Feminist book publishing companies
Mass media companies based in Delhi
Indian companies established in 2004
Publishing companies established in 2004